"The Shoes You're Wearing" is a song co-written and recorded by American country music artist Clint Black.  It was released in April 1998 as the fourth single from Black's Nothin' but the Taillights album.  The song reached Number One on the U.S. Billboard Hot Country Singles & Tracks (now Hot Country Songs) chart and reached number one in Canada.  It was written by Black and Hayden Nicholas.

Critical reception
Chuck Taylor, of Billboard magazine reviewed the song favorably saying that the song is "about equality among people in forthright but not preachy terms" Taylor goes on to say that "the melody and the background have an airy, Eagles-esque feel that sounds radio-friendly."

Music video
The music video was directed by Clint Black and Brent Hedgecock, and premiered in mid-1998.

Chart performance
"The Shoes You're Wearing" debuted at number 52 on the U.S. Billboard Hot Country Singles & Tracks for the week of April 11, 1998.

Year-end charts

References

1998 singles
1997 songs
Clint Black songs
Songs written by Clint Black
Songs written by Hayden Nicholas
Song recordings produced by Clint Black
Song recordings produced by James Stroud
RCA Records Nashville singles